William Dreyer may refer to:

 William Dreyer, co-founder of Dreyer's, an American producer of ice cream
 William J. Dreyer (1928–2004), molecular immunologist